A mudra is a symbolic or ritual gesture or pose in Hinduism, Jainism and Buddhism.

Mudra may also refer to:

 Mudra (music), a term woven into compositions in Indian classical music that indicates the identity of the composer
 Mudra (film), a 1989 Indian Malayalam film
 Mudra (surname), a predominantly Czech–Slovak surname
 Micro Units Development and Refinance Agency Bank, or MUDRA Bank, a public sector financial institution in India
Mudrarakshasa, ancient Indian drama by Vishakhadatta, about the mudra (signet) of the Nanda Empire minister Rakshasa

.